Zizers railway station is a railway station in the municipality of Zizers, in the Swiss canton of Grisons. It is an intermediate stop on the Rhaetian Railway  Landquart–Thusis line. The Swiss Federal Railways standard gauge Chur–Rorschach line runs parallel but has no intermediate stops between Chur and Landquart.

Services
Zizers is served by regional trains and the S1 of the Chur S-Bahn:

 RegioExpress: hourly service between Disentis/Mustér and Scuol-Tarasp.
 Regio: limited service between Disentis/Mustér and Scuol-Tarasp.
 Chur S-Bahn : hourly service between Rhäzüns and Schiers.

References

External links
 
 

Railway stations in Graubünden
Rhaetian Railway stations
Railway stations in Switzerland opened in 1896